Züünkharaa  is a city, the center of the Mandal sum (district) of Selenge Province in northern Mongolia. The city population is about 20,004 (2018).

There is a spirit and beverage factory since 1943, now it has a capacity to produce 15 tonnes of vodka (approximately 140 barrels) in 24 hours.

References

Populated places in Mongolia